Pool B of the 2021 Rugby World Cup began on 9 October 2022. The pool includes Canada and inaugural champions the United States, who finished 5th and 4th respectively in 2017. They are joined by Italy, who qualified as champions of the European Qualification Tournament, and by Japan, who qualified as the highest Asian team in the World Rankings following the cancellation of Asia Qualifying.

Standings

United States vs Italy

Notes:
This was Italy's first win over the United States.
 Giordana Duca was originally named as a lock for Italy, but withdrew before kickoff due to injury. She was replaced by Sara Tounesi while Beatrice Veronese took Tounesi's place onto the bench.

Japan vs Canada

Notes:
 This was Canada's 150th test match.
 Taylor Perry was originally named at fly-half for Canada, but withdrew due to injury. Julia Schell was promoted from the bench while Anaïs Holly took Schell's place on the bench.

United States vs Japan

Notes:
Olivia DeMerchant (Canada) earned her 50th test cap.
Sara Tounesi was originally named on Italy's bench at 19, but withdrew before kickoff due to injury. Francesca Granzotto came onto the bench at 23, pushing everyone between 19 and 23 down a number.

Japan vs Italy